Jalgpalliklubi FC Ararat, commonly known as FC Ararat Tallinn, or simply as Ararat, is a football team based in Tallinn, Estonia, who play in the II liiga North/East. It was founded by a group of Armenian players to promote Armenian identity and named after Mount Ararat.

Players

Current squad
 As of 13 November 2019.

Statistics

League and Cup

References

External links
 Official website 

Football clubs in Tallinn
2005 establishments in Estonia
Association football clubs established in 2005
Armenian association football clubs outside Armenia